"Speedin'" is a song co-written and recorded by American rapper Rick Ross. It was released in October 16, 2007 as the lead single from his second album Trilla. The song features R&B singer R. Kelly. The song is produced by production team The Runners.

Remixes
"Speedin' (We the Best Remix)" (Official Remix) (featuring R. Kelly, DJ Khaled, Plies, Birdman, Busta Rhymes, DJ Drama, Webbie, Gorilla Zoe, Fat Joe, Torch & Gunplay of Triple C's, DJ Bigga Rankin', Flo Rida, Brisco and Lil' Wayne)
"Speedin' (Remix)" (featuring R. Kelly and Chris Brown)
- Also, Rick Ross's second verse is replaced with R. Kelly's verse.

Music video
The music video features cameo appearances by DJ Khaled, Fat Joe, Gunplay, Trina and Diddy. DJ Khaled and Rick Ross are stopped by the police on a Miami bridge for speeding and are asked for license and registration, but instead, Rick Ross gets out of the car and jumps off the bridge. Rick Ross races Diddy and Fat Joe on the water on speed boats and R. Kelly on the road.  At the end of the song, the officer is given a watch and tells Rick Ross and DJ Khaled to have a nice day and they drive off.

Charts

References

2007 singles
2007 songs
Rick Ross songs
R. Kelly songs
Def Jam Recordings singles
Song recordings produced by the Runners
Songs written by R. Kelly
Songs written by Kevin Cossom
Songs written by Rick Ross
Songs written by Jermaine Jackson (hip hop producer)
Songs written by Andrew Harr
Music videos directed by Gil Green

it:Speedin'